The 2010 SAP Open was a men's tennis tournament played on indoor hard courts. It was the 122nd edition of the SAP Open, and was part of the ATP World Tour 250 series of the 2010 ATP World Tour. It took place at the HP Pavilion in San Jose, California, United States, from February 8 through February 14, 2010.

The singles draw featured ATP No. 7, 2010 Brisbane International champion Andy Roddick, and defending champion Radek Štěpánek. Other players included Fernando Verdasco, Tommy Haas, Mardy Fish, Sam Querrey, Tomáš Berdych and Philipp Kohlschreiber.

Fernando Verdasco and former ATP World Tour champion Pete Sampras played an exhibition match on the first day of the event. Verdasco won by the score of 6–3, 7–6(2).

Entrants

Seeds 

1 Rankings as of February 1, 2010.

Other entrants 
The following players received wildcards into the main draw:
  Devin Britton
  Ryan Harrison
  Lars Pörschke

The following players received entry from the qualifying draw:
  Ričardas Berankis
  Alex Bogomolov Jr.
  Ryler DeHeart
  Tim Smyczek

The following player received the lucky loser spot:
  Im Kyu-tae

Finals

Singles 

 Fernando Verdasco defeated  Andy Roddick, 3–6, 6–4, 6–4
It was Verdasco's first title of the year and 4th of his career.

Doubles 

 Mardy Fish /  Sam Querrey defeated  Benjamin Becker /  Leonardo Mayer, 7–6(7–3), 7–5

References 

 
SAP Open
SAP Open
SAP Open
SAP Open
SAP Open